The 2017 BYU Cougars baseball team represents Brigham Young University in the 2017 NCAA Division I baseball season.  Mike Littlewood acts in his fifth season as head coach of the Cougars. BYU was picked to finish fourth in the WCC Pre-season rankings. The Cougars would overcome all expectations and claim a tri-team championship in the regular season. Afterwards the Cougars would win the West Coast Conference tournament for the first time in their history, claiming the conferences automatic bid to the NCAA tournament, the Cougars first tournament berth since 2002. The Cougars were placed in the Stanford Regional where they would go 1–2. The Cougars finished the season 38–21.

2017 roster

Schedule 

! style="background:#FFFFFF;color:#002654;"| Regular Season
|- 

|- align="center" bgcolor="ffbbb"
| February 17 || at #21 Georgia Tech || – || Russ Chandler Stadium  || ACC Extra || 3–5 || X. Curry (1–0) || Maverik Buffo (0–1) || Z. Ryan (1) || 1,660 || 0–1 || –
|- align="center" bgcolor="ccffcc"
| February 18 || at Kennesaw State || – || Stillwell Stadium  || Eversport || 13–4 || Brady Corless (1–0) || A. Moore (0–1) || None || 742 || 1–1 || –
|- align="center" bgcolor="ffbbb"
| February 20 || at Georgia State || – || Georgia State Baseball Complex  || Facebook || 2–3 (10) || L. Barnette (1–0) || Riley Gates (0–1) || None || 315 || 1–2 || –
|- align="center" bgcolor="ccffcc"
| February 23 || vs. Northern Colorado || – || Billy Hebert Field  || Facebook || 6–0 || Maverik Buffo (1–1) || C. Carroll (0–1) || None || 127 || 2–2 || –
|- align="center" bgcolor="ffbbb"
| February 23 || vs. San Jose State || – || Billy Hebert Field  || Facebook || 2–3 (13) || J. Goldberg (1–0) || Mason Marshall (0–1) || None || 131 || 2–3 || –
|- align="center" bgcolor="ccffcc"
| February 24 || vs. Northern Colorado || – || Billy Hebert Field  || Facebook || 10–9  (10) || Riley Gates (1–1) || B. Minnick (1–1) || None || 141 || 3–3 || –
|- align="center" bgcolor="ffbbb"
| February 25 || vs. San Jose State || – || Billy Hebert Field  || Facebook || 2–4 || J. Banger (1–0) || Bo Burrup (0–1) || J. Goldberg || 199 || 3–4 || –
|-

|- align="center" bgcolor="ffbbb"
| March 2 || at CSU Bakersfield || – || Hardt Field  || YouTube || 4–5 || M. Carter (2–0) || Maverik Buffo (1–2) || Dewsnap || 653 || 3–5 || –
|- align="center" bgcolor="ccffcc"
| March 3 || at CSU Bakersfield || – || Hardt Field  || YouTube || 10–2 || Brady Corless (2–0) || Mahlik Jones (1–1) || None || 777 || 4–5 || –
|- align="center" bgcolor="ffbbb"
| March 4 || at CSU Bakersfield || – || Hardt Field  || YouTube || 5–7 || Moten (2–1) || Kendall Motes (0–1) || None || 640 || 4–6 || –
|- align="center" bgcolor="ffbbb"
| March 9 || UCSB || – || Larry H. Miller Field  || TheW.tv || 8–10 || N. Davis (3–1) || Maverik Buffo (1–3) || A. Garcia || 1,447 || 4–7 || –
|- align="center" bgcolor="ccffcc"
| March 10 || UCSB || – || Larry H. Miller Field  || TheW.tv || 7–6 || Aaron Cross (1–0) || S. Barry (0–1) || None || 2,747 || 5–7 || –
|- align="center" bgcolor="ccffcc"
| March 10 || UCSB || – || Larry H. Miller Field  || TheW.tv || 17–3 || Hayden Rogers (1–0) || C. Clements (0–3) || None || 2,747 || 6–7 || –
|- align="center" bgcolor="ccffcc"
| March 11 || UCSB || – || Larry H. Miller Field  || BYUtv || 14–8 || Bo Burrup (1–1) || S. Ledesma (0–2) || Aaron Cross (1) || 1,997 || 7–7 || –
|- align="center" bgcolor="ffbbb"
| March 14 || New Mexico State || – || Larry H. Miller Field  || BYUtv || 6–8 || Mattew McHugh (2–1) || Mason Marshall (0–2) || Ruger Rodriguez || 1,166 || 7–8 || –
|- align="center" bgcolor="ccffcc"
| March 16 || UConn || – || Larry H. Miller Field  || Facebook || 7–6 || Maverik Buffo (2–3) || R. Radue (0–2) || Aaron Cross (2) || 1,099 || 8–8  || –
|- align="center" bgcolor="ffbbb"
| March 17 || UConn || – || Larry H. Miller Field  || TheW.tv || 7–8 || J. Russell (1–0) || Aaron Cross (1–1) || None || 1,538 || 8–9 || –
|- align="center" bgcolor="ccffcc"
| March 18 || UConn || – || Larry H. Miller Field  || BYUtv || 10–9 || Jordan Wood (1–0) || D. Rajkowski (0–1) || None || 1,622 || 9–9  || –
|- align="center" bgcolor="ccffcc"
| March 23 ||  || – || George C. Page Stadium  || TheW.tv || 5–3 || Maverik Buffo (3–3) || B. Redman (2–4) ||  || 175 || 10–9 || 1–0
|- align="center" bgcolor="ffbbb"
| March 24 ||  || – || George C. Page Stadium  || TheW.tv || 5–9 || B. Arriaga (3–0) || Bo Burrup (1–2) || H. Simon || 237 || 10–10  || 1–1
|- align="center" bgcolor="ffbbb"
| March 25 ||  || – || George C. Page Stadium  || TheW.tv || 0–2 || C. Abbott (4–1) || Hayden Rogers (1–1) || None || 386 || 10–11  || 1–2
|- align="center" bgcolor="ccffcc"
| March 28 || at Utah || – || Smith's Ballpark  || P12 MTN || 11–6 || Mason Marshall (1–2) || J. Rebar (2–4) ||  || 2,666 || 11–11 || –
|- align="center" bgcolor="ccffcc"
| March 30 || Saint Mary's* || – || Larry H. Miller Field  || BYUtv || 7–6 || Riley Gates (2–1) || A. Hansen (0–1) ||  || 731 || 12–11 || 2–2
|- align="center" bgcolor="ccffcc"
| March 31 || Saint Mary's* || – || Larry H. Miller Field  || BYUtv || 6–2 || Brady Corless (3–0) || J. Valdez (3–2) || None || 1,147 || 13–11 || 3–2
|-

|- align="center" bgcolor="ccffcc"
| April 1 || Saint Mary's* || – || Larry H. Miller Field  || TheW.tv || 14–1 || Hayden Rogers (2–1) || J. York (3–2) || None || 1,016 || 14–11 || 4–2
|- align="center" bgcolor="ffbbb"
| April 3 || Oregon || – || Larry H. Miller Field  || BYUtv || 6–9 || C. Zwetsch (1–2) || Aaron Cross (1–2) || K. Yovan || 1,845 || 14–12 || –
|- align="center" bgcolor="ccffcc"
| April 6 || at Pacific* || – || Klein Family Field  || TheW.tv || 6–0 || Maverik Buffo (4–3) || Shreve (1–3) || None || 149 || 15–12 || 5–2
|- align="center" bgcolor="ccffcc"
| April 7 || at Pacific* || – || Klein Family Field  || TheW.tv || 12–1 || Brady Corless (4–0) || W. Lyndon (3–3) || Mason Marshall (1) || 393 || 16–12  || 6–2
|- align="center" bgcolor="ccffcc"
| April 8 || at Pacific* || – || Klein Family Field  || TheW.tv || 5–2 || Hayden Rogers (3–1) || R. Reynoso (3–4) ||  || 393 || 17–12 || 7–2
|- align="center" bgcolor="ccffcc"
| April 11 || at Utah Valley || – || Brent Brown Ballpark  || WAC DN || 8–3 || Jordan Wood (2–0) || O. Sebek (0–2) || None || 3,892 || 18–12 || –
|- align="center" bgcolor="ffbbb"
| April 13 || Pepperdine* || – || Larry H. Miller Field  || BYUtv || 7–11 || R. Wilson (2–3) || Maverik Buffo (4–4) || M. Mahony || 2,058 || 18–13 || 7–3
|- align="center" bgcolor="ccffcc"
| April 14 || Pepperdine* || – || Larry H. Miller Field  || TheW.tv || 7–2 || Brady Corless (5–0) || J. Pendergast (4–3) || None || 2,386 || 19–13 || 8–3
|- align="center" bgcolor="ccffcc"
| April 15 || Pepperdine* || – || Larry H. Miller Field  || TheW.tv || 9–4 || Hayden Rogers (4–1) || W. Jensen (2–4) || Riley Gates (1) || 2,126 || 20–13 || 9–3
|- align="center" bgcolor="CCCCCC"
|April 18 || at Utah || – || Smith's Ballpark || P12 MTN || colspan=7|  Cancelled- inclement weather
|- align="center" bgcolor="ffbbb"
| April 20 || at #19 San Diego* || – || Fowler Park  || TheW.tv || 3–6 || Nick Sprengel (7–1) || Maverik Buffo (4–5) || Troy Conyers (10) || 546 || 20–14  || 9–4
|- align="center" bgcolor="ccffcc"
| April 21 || at #19 San Diego* || – || Fowler Park  || TheW.tv || 9–8 (10) || Riley Gates (3–1) || C. Burdick (2–2) || None || 1,099 || 21–14 || 10–4
|- align="center" bgcolor="ccffcc"
| April 22 || at #19 San Diego* || – || Fowler Park  || TheW.tv || 12–8 || Jordan Wood (3–0) || P. Richan (4–1) || None || 436 || 22–14 || 11–4
|- align="center" bgcolor="ccffcc"
| April 27 || San Francisco* || – || Larry H. Miller Field  || BYUtv || 19–6 || Maverik Buffo (5–5) || G. Goodman (3–4) || None || 1,247 || 23–14 || 12–4
|- align="center" bgcolor="ccffcc"
| April 28 || San Francisco* || – || Larry H. Miller Field  || BYUtv || 8–5 || Bo Burrup (2–2) || B. Jenkins (0–3) || Riley Gates (2) || 1,188 || 24–14 || 13–4
|- align="center" bgcolor="ccffcc"
| April 29 || San Francisco* || – || Larry H. Miller Field  || TheW.tv || 11–5 || Hayden Rogers (5–1) || D. Slominski (3–5) || None || 2,115 || 25–14 || 14–4
|-

|- align="center" bgcolor="ccffcc"
|May 2 || at Utah Valley || #22 || Brent Brown Ballpark || WAC DN || 23–4 || Jordan Wood (4–0) || E. Olguin (2–3) || None || 4,619 || 26–14 || –
|- align="center" bgcolor="ccffcc"
|May 4 || at Santa Clara* || #22 || Stephen Schott Stadium || TheW.tv || 9–3 || Maverik Buffo (6–5) || G. Nechak (1–6) || None || 155 || 27–14 || 15–4
|- align="center" bgcolor="ccffcc"
|May 5 || at Santa Clara* || #22 || Stephen Schott Stadium || TheW.tv || 13–7 || Mason Marshall (1–0) || E. Lex (3–7) || None || 188 || 28–14 || 16–4
|- align="center" bgcolor="ccffcc"
|May 6 || at Santa Clara* || #22 || Stephen Schott Stadium || TheW.tv || 8–4 || Hayden Rogers (6–1) || J. Steffens (3–6) || None || 188 || 29–14 || 17–4
|- align="center" bgcolor="ffbbb"
|May 9 || Utah || #18 || Larry H. Miller Field || KBYU || 6–7 (13) || T. Thomas (2–0) || Kendall Motes (0–1) || R. Ottesen || 2,392 || 29–15 || –
|- align="center" bgcolor="ccffcc"
|May 11 || Portland* || #18 || Larry H. Miller Field || BYUtv || 23–19 || Mason Marshall (3–2) || C. Richman (0–1) || None || 1,567 || 30–15 || 18–4
|- align="center" bgcolor="ccffcc"
|May 12 || Portland* || #18 || Larry H. Miller Field || BYUtv || 11–3 || Brady Corless (6–0) || G. Miller (1–8) || None || 2,158 || 31–15 || 19–4
|- align="center" bgcolor="ccffcc"
|May 13 || Portland* || #18 || Larry H. Miller Field || BYUtv || 16–3 || Hayden Rogers (7–1) || K. Baker (3–6) || None || 1,631 || 32–15 || 20–4
|- align="center" bgcolor="ccffcc"
|May 16 || Utah Valley || #18 || Larry H. Miller Field || BYUtv || 7–6 || Bo Burrup (3–2) || M. Briones (2–1) || Mason Marshall (2) || 1,702 || 33–15 || –
|- align="center" bgcolor="ffbbb"
|May 18 || at Gonzaga* || #18 || Patterson Complex || SWX || 2–10 || E. Morgan (9–2) || Maverik Buffo (6–6) || None || 629 || 33–16 || 20–5
|- align="center" bgcolor="ffbbb"
|May 19 || at Gonzaga* || #18 || Patterson Complex || TheW.tv || 4–10 || J. Vernia (6–4) || Bo Burrup (3–3) || C. Legumina || 918 || 33–17 || 20–6
|- align="center" bgcolor="ffbbb"
|May 20 || at Gonzaga* || #18 || Patterson Complex || ESPNU || 2–6 || D. Bies (5–2) || Hayden Rogers (7–2) || W. Mills || 1,125 || 33–18 || 20–7
|-

|-
! style="background:#FFFFFF;color:#002654;"| 2017 West Coast Conference baseball tournament
|- 

|- align="center" bgcolor="ffbbb"
|May 25 ||  || – || Banner Island Ballpark || TheW.tv || 2–3 || B. Arriaga (7–2) || Brady Corless (6–1) || C. Paiva || 1,321 || 33–19 || –
|- align="center" bgcolor="ccffcc"
|May 26 || vs. Saint Mary's* || – || Banner Island Ballpark || TheW.tv || 8–4 || Hayden Rogers (8–2) || J. Valdez (4–3) || None || 1,561 || 34–19 || –
|- align="center" bgcolor="ccffcc"
|May 26 ||  || – || Banner Island Ballpark || TheW.tv || 5–4 || Maverik Buffo (7–6) || B. Redman (5–7) || Riley Gates (3) || 1,561 || 35–19 || –
|- align="center" bgcolor="ccffcc"
|May 27 || vs. #22 Gonzaga* || – || Banner Island Ballpark || TheW.tv || 10–3 || Jordan Wood (5–0) || D. Bies (5–3) || None || 1,442 || 36–19 || –
|- align="center" bgcolor="ccffcc"
|May 27 || vs. #22 Gonzaga* || – || Banner Island Ballpark || TheW.tv || 16–3 || Bo Burrup (4–3) || S. Hellinger (4–3) || None || 1,442 || 37–19 || –
|-

|-
! style="background:#FFFFFF;color:#002654;"| 2017 NCAA Division I baseball tournament
|- 

|- align="center" bgcolor="ffbbb"
|June 1 || vs. #23 CS Fullerton || #26 || Klein Field at Sunken Diamond || ESPN3 || 2–10 || C. Seabold (11–4) || Brady Corless (6–2) || None || 1,390 || 37–20 || –
|- align="center" bgcolor="ccffcc"
|June 2 || vs. Sacramento State || #26 || Klein Field at Sunken Diamond || ESPN3 || 6–1 || Hayden Rogers (9–2) || P. Brahms (8–4) || None || 1,420 || 38–20 || –
|- align="center" bgcolor="ffbbb"
|June 3 || vs. #6 Stanford || #26 || Klein Field at Sunken Diamond || ESPN3 || 1–9 || C. Castellanos (9–3) || Maverik Buffo (7–7) || None || 1,736 || 38–21 || –
|-

|-
| style="font-size:88%" | Rankings from Collegiate Baseball. Parenthesis indicate tournament seedings.
|-
| style="font-size:88%" | *West Coast Conference games

Rivalries
BYU has two main rivalries on their schedule- the Deseret First Duel vs. Utah and the UCCU Crosstown Clash vs. Utah Valley.

Radio Information
Many BYU Baseball series had a radio/internet broadcast available. 44 games were broadcast on KOVO with Brent Norton (play-by-play) calling the games for his 25th consecutive season. A rotating selection of analysts were used. 42 of the games were simulcast on BYU Radio. BYU Radio also had 1 radio exclusive this season: the early Mar. 10 game vs. UC Santa Barbara.

TV Announcers
For the first time every game was shown on television or streamed live online as BYU Baseball carried the road games that weren't going to be streamed on Facebook Live. 
Feb 17: Wylie Ballard & Alex Keller
Feb 18: No commentators
Feb 20: Tuckett Slade
Feb 23: Tuckett Slade
Feb 23: Tuckett Slade
Feb 24: Tuckett Slade
Feb 25: Tuckett Slade
March 2: Corey Costelloe
March 3: Corey Costelloe
March 4: Corey Costelloe
March 9: Brent Norton & Gary Pullins
March 10: Brent Norton & Jeff Bills
March 10: Brent Norton  
March 11: Spencer Linton, Gary Sheide, & Jason Shepherd
March 14: Spencer Linton, Gary Sheide, & Jason Shepherd
March 16: Mitchell Marshall
March 17: Robbie Bullough & Marc Oslund
March 18: Dave McCann, Gary Sheide, & Jason Shepherd
March 23: Jesse Kass & Dalton Green
March 24: Jesse Kass & Raihan Ball
March 25: Jesse Kass & Javier Villagomez
March 28: Thad Anderson & Andy Lopez
March 30: Spencer Linton, Gary Sheide, & Jason Shepherd
March 31: Spencer Linton, Gary Sheide, & Jason Shepherd
April 1: Brent Norton & Cameron Coughlan
April 3: Spencer Linton, Gary Sheide, & Jason Shepherd
April 6: Jeff Dominick & Mark Walch
April 7: Jeff Dominick & Mark Walch
April 8: Jeff Dominick & Mark Walch
April 11: Jordan Bianucci & Ryan Pickens
April 13: Spencer Linton, Gary Sheide, & Jason Shepherd
April 14: Brent Norton & Ryan Hancock
April 15: Brent Norton & Cameron Coughlan
April 20: Jack Murray & John "JC" Cunningham
April 21: Jack Murray & John Cunningham
April 22: Jack Murray & John Cunningham
April 27: Spencer Linton, Gary Sheide, & Jason Shepherd
April 28: Spencer Linton, Gary Sheide, & Jason Shepherd
April 29: Brent Norton 
May 2: Jordan Bianucci & Ryan Pickens
May 4: David Gentile
May 5: David Gentile
May 6: David Gentile
May 9: Spencer Linton, Gary Sheide, & Jason Shepherd
May 11: Spencer Linton, Gary Sheide, & Jason Shepherd
May 12: Spencer Linton, Gary Sheide, & Jason Shepherd
May 13: Spencer Linton, Gary Sheide, & Jason Shepherd
May 16: Dave McCann, Gary Sheide, & Jason Shepherd
May 18: Sam Adams & Michael Jackson
May 19: George Devine & Alex Jensen
May 20: Roxy Bernstein & Wes Clements
May 25: Steve Quis, Alex Jensen, & Meghan von Behren
May 26: Steve Quis, Alex Jensen, & Meghan von Behren
May 26: Steve Quis, Alex Jensen, & Meghan von Behren
May 27: Steve Quis, Alex Jensen, & Meghan von Behren
May 27: Steve Quis, Alex Jensen, & Meghan von Behren
June 1: Steve Lenox & JT Snow
June 2: Steve Lenox & JT Snow
June 3: Steve Lenox & JT Snow

References 

2017 West Coast Conference baseball season
2017 team
2017 in sports in Utah
BYU